The Women's under-23 road race of the 2022 UCI Road World Championships was a cycling event that took place on 24 September 2022 in Wollongong, Australia.

Final classification

References

Women's under-23 road race
2022 in women's road cycling
UCI Road World Championships – Women's under-23 road race